McCoy is an unincorporated town, a census-designated place (CDP), and a post office located in and governed by Eagle County, Colorado, United States. The CDP is a part of the Edwards, CO Micropolitan Statistical Area. The McCoy post office has the ZIP Code 80463. At the United States Census 2010, the population of the McCoy CDP was 24, while the population of the 80463 ZIP Code Tabulation Area was 136 including adjacent areas.

History
The McCoy Post Office has been in operation since 1891. The community was named after Charles H. McCoy, a cattleman.

Geography
McCoy is located along the northern border of Eagle County in the valley of Rock Creek, less than one mile north of its mouth at the Colorado River. Colorado State Highway 131 passes through the community, leading south  to Interstate 70 at Wolcott and north  to Steamboat Springs.

Demographics

See also

Outline of Colorado
Index of Colorado-related articles
State of Colorado
Colorado cities and towns
Colorado census designated places
Colorado counties
Eagle County, Colorado
Colorado metropolitan areas
Edwards, CO Micropolitan Statistical Area

References

External links

McCoy @ Colorado.com
McCoy @ UncoverColorado.com
Eagle County website

Census-designated places in Eagle County, Colorado
Census-designated places in Colorado